Ikongwe is a village in Central District of Botswana. It is located 45 km east of Mahalapye. The village has a primary school, and the population was 471 in 2001 census.

References

Populated places in Central District (Botswana)
Villages in Botswana